Bani Talq is a sub-district located in As Sawd District, 'Amran Governorate, Yemen. Bani Talq had a population of 3170 according to the 2004 census.

References 

Sub-districts in As Sawd District